Kharsarai is a census town in Chanditala II CD Block in Srirampore subdivision of Hooghly district in the Indian state of West Bengal.

Geography

Location

Kharsarai, Tisa, Kapashanria, Jaykrishnapur, Purba Tajpur, Begampur, Baksa, Panchghara, Chikrand, Janai, Pairagachha, Naiti, Barijhati, Garalgachha and Krishnapur, all the census towns form a series from the northern part of Chanditala II CD Block to its southern part. The only municipality in the area, Dankuni, located outside the CD Block, occupies the south-east corner of the entire cluster.

Urbanisation
Srirampore subdivision is the most urbanized of the subdivisions in Hooghly district. 73.13% of the population in the subdivision is urban and 26.88% is rural. The subdivision has 6 municipalities and 34 census towns. The municipalities are: Uttarpara Kotrung Municipality, Konnagar Municipality, Serampore Municipality, Baidyabati Municipality, Rishra Municipality and Dankuni Municipality. Amongst the CD Blocks in the subdivision, Uttarapara Serampore (census towns shown in a separate map) had 76% urban population, Chanditala I 42%, Chanditala II 69% and Jangipara 7% (census towns shown in the map above). All places marked in the map are linked in the larger full screen map.

Demographics
As per 2011 Census of India, Kharsarai had a total population of 6,247 of which 3,145 (50%) were males and 3,102 (50%) were females. Population below 6 years was 591. The total number of literates in Kharsarai was 4,675 (82.66% of the population over 6 years).

 India census, Kharsarai had a population of 5850. Males constitute 51% of the population and females 49%. Kharsarai has an average literacy rate of 67%, higher than the national average of 59.5%: male literacy is 73%, and female literacy is 62%. In Kharsarai, 11% of the population is under 6 years of age. The occupation of most of the people of Kharsarai is related to weaving.

Dankuni Urban Agglomeration
As per the 2011 census, Dankuni Urban Agglomeration includes: Dankuni (M), Purba Tajpur (CT), Kharsarai (CT), Begampur (CT), Chikrand (CT), Pairagachha (CT), Barijhati (CT), Garalgachha (CT), Krishnapur (CT), Baruipara (CT), Borai (CT), Nawapara (CT), Basai (CT), Gangadharpur (CT),  Manirampur (CT), Janai (CT), Kapashanria (CT), Jaykrishnapur (CT), Tisa (CT), Baksa (CT), Panchghara (CT) and Naiti (CT).

Transport 

References

Census towns in Chanditala II CD Block